Shibertuy (Sheberte) is a rural locality (an ulus) in Bichursky District, Republic of Buryatia, Russia. The population was 1,167 as of 2010. There are 15 streets.

Geography 
Shibertuy is located 40 km northeast of Bichura (the district's administrative centre) by road. Dabatuy is the nearest rural locality.

References 

Rural localities in Bichursky District